Walnut Township is a township in Bourbon County, Kansas, USA.  As of the 2000 census, its population was 135.

Geography
According to the USGS, it contains one cemetery, Rosedale.

The streams of Owl Creek and Prong Creek run through this township.

Further reading

References

 USGS Geographic Names Information System (GNIS)

External links
 City-Data.com
 Bourbon County Maps: Current, Historic Collection

Townships in Bourbon County, Kansas
Townships in Kansas